Dimitri Magnokele Bissiki is a Congolese professional footballer, who plays as a defender for AC Léopards.

International career
In January 2014, coach Claude Le Roy, invited him to be a part of the Congo squad for the 2014 African Nations Championship. The team was eliminated in the group stages after losing to Ghana, drawing with Libya and defeating Ethiopia.

References

Honours

AC Léopards

Winner
 Congo Premier League (2): 2012, 2013,2014
 CAF Confederation Cup: 2012

Runner-up
 CAF Super Cup: 2013

External links 
 

Living people
Republic of the Congo footballers
2014 African Nations Championship players
Republic of the Congo A' international footballers
AC Léopards players
1991 births
2015 Africa Cup of Nations players

Association football defenders
Republic of the Congo international footballers
2018 African Nations Championship players
2020 African Nations Championship players